The women's 200 metre butterfly event at the 2004 Olympic Games was contested at the Olympic Aquatic Centre of the Athens Olympic Sports Complex in Athens, Greece on August 17 and 18.

Polish swimmer and world record holder Otylia Jędrzejczak added gold to her two silver medals by a storming victory in this event, and by becoming the nation's first ever swimming champion, in an outstanding time of 2:06.05. Three-time Olympian Petria Thomas of Australia managed to repeat her silver from Atlanta, lowering her time to 2:06.36. Japan's Yuko Nakanishi, on the other hand, took home the bronze at 2:08.04.

Records
Prior to this competition, the existing world and Olympic records were as follows.

Results

Heats

Semifinals

Semifinal 1

Semifinal 2

Final

References

External links
Official Olympic Report

W
2004 in women's swimming
Women's events at the 2004 Summer Olympics